Slow Me Down is a 2014 album by Sara Evans.

Slow Me Down may also refer to:

 "Slow Me Down" (song), the title track from that album
 "Slow Me Down", a 2016 song from the Issues album Headspace
 "Slow Me Down", a 2017 song from the Jessie Ware album Glasshouse

See also 
 Slow Down (disambiguation)